Dennis Parnell Sullivan (born February 12, 1941) is an American mathematician known for his work in algebraic topology, geometric topology, and dynamical systems. He holds the Albert Einstein Chair at the City University of New York Graduate Center and is a distinguished professor at Stony Brook University.

Sullivan was awarded the Wolf Prize in Mathematics in 2010 and the Abel Prize in 2022.

Early life and education
Sullivan was born in Port Huron, Michigan, on February 12, 1941. His family moved to Houston soon afterwards.

He entered Rice University to study chemical engineering but switched his major to mathematics in his second year after encountering a particularly motivating mathematical theorem. The change was prompted by a special case of the uniformization theorem, according to which, in his own words:

He received his Bachelor of Arts degree from Rice in 1963. He obtained his Doctor of Philosophy from Princeton University in 1966 with his thesis, Triangulating homotopy equivalences, under the supervision of William Browder.

Career
Sullivan worked at the University of Warwick on a NATO Fellowship from 1966 to 1967. He was a Miller Research Fellow at the University of California, Berkeley from 1967 to 1969 and then a Sloan Fellow at Massachusetts Institute of Technology from 1969 to 1973. He was a visiting scholar at the Institute for Advanced Study in 1967–1968, 1968–1970, and again in 1975.

Sullivan was an associate professor at Paris-Sud University from 1973 to 1974, and then became a permanent professor at the Institut des Hautes Études Scientifiques (IHÉS) in 1974. In 1981, he became the Albert Einstein Chair in Science (Mathematics) at the Graduate Center, City University of New York and reduced his duties at the IHÉS to a half-time appointment. He joined the mathematics faculty at Stony Brook University in 1996 and left the IHÉS the following year.

Sullivan was involved in the founding of the Simons Center for Geometry and Physics and is a member of its board of trustees.

Research

Topology

Geometric topology
Along with Browder and his other students, Sullivan was an early adopter of surgery theory, particularly for classifying high-dimensional manifolds. His thesis work was focused on the Hauptvermutung.

In an influential set of notes in 1970, Sullivan put forward the radical concept that, within homotopy theory, spaces could directly "be broken into boxes" (or localized), a procedure hitherto applied to the algebraic constructs made from them.

The Sullivan conjecture, proved in its original form by Haynes Miller, states that the classifying space BG of a finite group G is sufficiently different from any finite CW complex X, that it maps to such an X only 'with difficulty'; in a more formal statement, the space of all mappings BG to X, as pointed spaces and given the compact-open topology, is weakly contractible. Sullivan's conjecture was also first presented in his 1970 notes.

Sullivan and Daniel Quillen (independently) created rational homotopy theory in the late 1960s and 1970s. It examines "rationalizations" of simply connected topological spaces with homotopy groups and singular homology groups tensored with the rational numbers, ignoring torsion elements and simplifying certain calculations.

Kleinian groups
Sullivan and William Thurston generalized Lipman Bers' density conjecture from singly degenerate Kleinian surface groups to all finitely generated Kleinian groups in the late 1970s and early 1980s. The conjecture states that every finitely generated Kleinian group is an algebraic limit of geometrically finite Kleinian groups, and was independently proven by Ohshika and Namazi–Souto in 2011 and 2012 respectively.

Conformal and quasiconformal mappings
The Connes–Donaldson–Sullivan–Teleman index theorem is an extension of the Atiyah–Singer index theorem to quasiconformal manifolds due to a joint paper by Simon Donaldson and Sullivan in 1989 and a joint paper by Alain Connes, Sullivan, and Nicolae Teleman in 1994.

In 1987, Sullivan and Burton Rodin proved Thurston's conjecture about the approximation
of the Riemann map by circle packings.

String topology
Sullivan and Moira Chas started the field of string topology, which examines algebraic structures on the homology of free loop spaces. They developed the Chas–Sullivan product to give a partial singular homology analogue of the cup product from singular cohomology. String topology has been used in multiple proposals to construct topological quantum field theories in mathematical physics.

Dynamical systems
In 1975, Sullivan and Bill Parry introduced the topological Parry–Sullivan invariant for flows in one-dimensional dynamical systems.

In 1985, Sullivan proved the no-wandering-domain theorem. This result was described by mathematician Anthony Philips as leading to a "revival of holomorphic dynamics after 60 years of stagnation."

Awards and honors
 1971 Oswald Veblen Prize in Geometry 
 1981 Prix Élie Cartan, French Academy of Sciences
 1983 Member, National Academy of Sciences 
 1991 Member, American Academy of Arts and Sciences 
 1994 King Faisal International Prize for Science
 2004 National Medal of Science
 2006 Steele Prize for lifetime achievement
 2010 Wolf Prize in Mathematics, for "his contributions to algebraic topology and conformal dynamics"
 2012 Fellow of the American Mathematical Society
 2014 Balzan Prize in Mathematics (pure or applied)
 2022 Abel Prize

Personal life
Sullivan is married to fellow mathematician Moira Chas.

See also
 Assembly map
 Double bubble conjecture
 Flexible polyhedron
 Formal manifold
 Loch Ness monster surface
 Normal invariant
 Ring lemma
 Rummler–Sullivan theorem
 Ruziewicz problem

References

External links

 
 
 Sullivan's homepage at CUNY
 Sullivan's homepage at Stony Brook University
  Dennis Sullivan  International Balzan Prize Foundation

1941 births
20th-century American mathematicians
21st-century American mathematicians
Abel Prize laureates
City University of New York faculty
Dynamical systems theorists
Graduate Center, CUNY faculty
Fellows of the American Mathematical Society
Homotopy theory
Living people
Mathematicians from Michigan
Members of the United States National Academy of Sciences
National Medal of Science laureates
Princeton University alumni
Recipients of the Great Cross of the National Order of Scientific Merit (Brazil)
Rice University alumni
Stony Brook University faculty
Topologists
Wolf Prize in Mathematics laureates